Kekko Fornarelli (born 10 January 1978 in Bari, Italy) is an Italian jazz pianist and composer.

Biography 

Kekko Fornarelli is a pianist and a composer. He was born in Bari, Italy in 1978. He began learning classical piano at the age of three, first through private tuition and later at the Conservatorio Piccinni in Bari.

Fornarelli's interest in jazz music began at the age of 18. From there on, he has immersed himself in jazz, which has led him to travel worldwide.

He has recorded four albums, Circular Thought in 2005, A French Man in New York (2008), inspired by French pianist Michel Petrucciani in the three years he spent in France. 
Room of mirrors was released in 2011 by Auand sound. Alison Bentley writes "I can't stop listening to the CD: a fusion of Romantic classical music, modern jazz and 21st century dance rhythms, played with Italian brio from the heart."
His last work, "Outrush" was released in 2014.

Eric Vloeimans, Flavio Boltro, Rosario Giuliani, Francesco Bearzatti, Benjamin Henocq, Jerome Regard, Manhu Roche, Luca Bulgarelli are only some of the artists he has shared ideas, sounds, life experiences and stages with.
The tour that has brought his music to more than 25 countries over the world in the last two years – Russia and all Europe, Asia, Australia – is a huge success everywhere. 
 
"Fornarelli is a skilful instrumentalist with classical roots and a subtle improviser's mind". Alison Gunn of the Financial Times writes "A near-perfect balance of tension and freedom. Fornarelli's music has a pared-down yet catchy style that draws on his classical roots, with influences from pop to trip-hop to gospel"

Paolo Fresu writes: "As long as there are musicians as open minded as Kekko Fornarelli, jazz will carry on being the World's music. Kekko’s intimacy is made of rich melodies and chord progressions which evoke some delicate forms of modern jazz, but are translated by that particular touch which makes him one of the most interesting young pianist of the moment."

Discography 
 Circular Thought, 2005 (Wide)
 A French Man in New York, 2008 (Wide Sound)
 Room of Mirrors, 2011 (Auand Records)
 Outrush, 2014 (Abeat)

References

External links 
 Official website
 Profile on Musicbrainz
 Profile on BBC Music
 Soundcloud
 Facebook page
 Reverbnation

1978 births
Italian jazz pianists
Italian male pianists
Living people
21st-century pianists
21st-century Italian male musicians
Male jazz musicians